The 1933 Syracuse Orangemen football team represented Syracuse University in the 1933 college football season. The Orangemen were led by fourth-year head coach Vic Hanson and played their home games at Archbold Stadium in Syracuse, New York.

Schedule

References

Syracuse
Syracuse Orange football seasons
Syracuse Orangemen football